Hajjiabad (also Romanized as Ḩājjīābād; also known as Ḩājīābād) is a village in Tiab Rural District, in the Central District of Minab County, Hormozgan Province, Iran. At the 2006 census, its population was 748, in 146 families.

References 

Populated places in Minab County